Qualifying matches for the Football at the 2011 All-Africa Games – Women's tournament.

Qualification 
Draw made in December 2010.

Zone 1 [North Africa] 

 qualified for the final tournament as the only entry from Zone 1.

Zone 2 [West Africa 1] 

The first leg was scheduled to take place on 11–13 February 2011. The second leg was scheduled to take place on 25–27 February 2011

|}

 qualified for the final tournament after  withdrew.

Zone 3 [West Africa 2]

Preliminary round 

The first leg is scheduled to take place on 11–13 February 2011. The second leg is scheduled to take place on 25–27 February 2011

|}

First round 

The first leg is scheduled to take place on 29–30 April and 1 May 2011. The second leg is scheduled to take place on 15–17 May 2011.

|}

 qualified for the final tournament.

Zone 4 [Central Africa]

Preliminary round 

The first leg is scheduled to take place on 11–13 February 2011. The second leg is scheduled to take place on 25–27 February 2011

|}

First round 

The first leg is scheduled to take place on 29–30 April and 1 May 2011. The second leg is scheduled to take place on 15–17 May 2011.

|}

 qualified for the final tournament after  withdrew.

Zone 5 [East Africa]

Preliminary round 

The first leg was scheduled to take place on 11–13 February 2011. The second leg was scheduled to take place on 25–27 February 2011

|}

First round 

The first leg is scheduled to take place on 29–30 April and 1 May 2011. The second leg is scheduled to take place on 15–17 May 2011.

|}

 qualified for the final tournament after  withdrew.

Zone 6 [Southern Africa]

Preliminary round 

The first leg took place on 13 February 2011. The second leg took place on 27 February 2011

|}

First round 

The first leg is scheduled to take place on 29–30 April and 1 May 2011. The second leg is scheduled to take place on 15–17 May 2011.

|}
 and  qualified for the final tournament

Zone 7 [Indian Ocean] 

No entries.  One extra team will qualify from Zone 6 as a result.

Qualified teams
The following countries have qualified for the final tournament:

  (Hosts)
  (Zone 1)
  (Zone 2)
  (Zone 3)
  (Zone 4)
  (Zone 5)
  (Zone 6)
  (Zone 6)

References 

Qualification
2011